Li Ting and Sun Tiantian were the defending champions and successfully defended their title, by defeating Gisela Dulko and María Sánchez Lorenzo 6–2, 6–2 in the final.

It was the 9th title for Li and the 8th title for Sun in their respective doubles careers. It was also the 2nd title for the pair during the season, after their win in Pattaya City.

Seeds

Draw

References
 Main and Qualifying Rounds

2006 Estoril Open